Alexander II may refer to:

 Alexander II of Macedon, king of Macedon from 370 to 368 BC
 Alexander II of Epirus (died 260 BC), king of Epirus in 272 BC
 Alexander II Zabinas, king of the Greek Seleucid kingdom in 128–123 BC
 Pope Alexander II of Alexandria, ruled in 702–729
 Patriarch Alexander II of Alexandria
 Pope Alexander II (died 1073), pope from 1061 to 1073
 Alexander II of Scotland (1198–1249), king of Scots
 Alexander II of Imereti (died 1510, 1483–1510), king of Georgia and of Imereti
 Alexander II of Kakheti (1527–1605), king of Kakheti
 Alexander II Mircea
 Alexander II of Russia (1818–1881), emperor of Russia
 Alexander II of Yugoslavia (born 1945), crown prince of Serbia

See also
King Alexander (disambiguation)